Halkhori  is a village development committee in Mahottari District in the Janakpur Zone of south-eastern Nepal. At the time of the 2011 Nepal census it had a population of 6033 people living in 1051 individual households.

References

External links
Map of the municipalities of Mahottari District

Populated places in Mahottari District